Indonesia competed in the 2017 Asian Winter Games in Sapporo and Obihiro, Japan from 19 to 26 February, supported by Indonesian Olympic Committee & IWSC Indonesia. The country competed in two sports (three disciplines). The Indonesian team consisted of 34 athletes. This was the first time Indonesia take part at the Asian Winter Games.

Competitors
The following table lists the Indonesian delegation per sport and gender.

Figure skating

Indonesia competed in the figure skating competitions.

Singles

Ice hockey

Indonesia entered a men's hockey team. The team competed in division two. Indonesia finished in eighth (and last) place (18th place overall) in division 2 of the competition.

Men's tournament

Indonesia was represented by the following 23 athletes:

Zaharul Haq (G)
Sangga Putra (G)
Susanto (G)
Muchammad Athalaa (D)
Victor Budiwarman (D)
Ronald Chandra (D)
Andianto Hie (D)
Stephanus Sugianto (D)
Rinaldo Sutjipto (D)
Syailendra Bakrie (F)
Felix Cahyono (F)
Jusuf Hendrata (F)
Aditya Landreth (F)
Yaser Muhammad (F)
Abraham Novendra (F)
Roy Nugraha (F)
Anryan Saputra (F)
Jonathan Sudharta (F)
Stefanus Suryadi (F)
Felix Utama  (F)
Ronald Wijaya (F)
Ready Wongso (F)
Felix Yussanto (F)

Legend: G = Goalie, D = Defense-man, F = Forward
Group B

Short track speed skating

Indonesia competed in short track speed skating.

Men
Allan Chandra Moedjiono
Stevanus Wihardja
Johanes Wihardja
Muhammad Oky Andrianto

Women
Alifia Meidia Namasta
Gita Widya Yunika

Short track speed skating

Men

Qualification legend: Q - Qualify based on position in heat; q - Qualify based on time in field; FA - Qualify to medal final; FB - Qualify to consolation final

References

Nations at the 2017 Asian Winter Games
Asian Winter Games
Indonesia at the Asian Winter Games